The Football Association of Odisha League is the top state football league of the Indian state of Odisha, organised by Football Association of Odisha (FAO), the official football governing body of Odisha, in association with Department of Sports & Youth Services (DSYS), Government of Odisha.

History
The major domestic league in the state held at Cuttack was known as Cuttack Football League until 2010 when FAO decided to restructure the league as FAO league. It continues as the top tier competition for Cuttack based football clubs.

The FAO League was brought up as Siddhartha Odisha First Division League in 2010 as Odisha's premier level football league. Football Association of Odisha introduced  league system to provide footballing talents of the state a platform to showcase their abilities. League system continued with the same format for seven years, until getting its revamp in 2018.
Since the inception of the FAO League, a total of five clubs have been crowned champions. Sunrise have won the most titles in league history, being crowned champions four times. Odisha Police have won the league twice whereas East Coast Railway, Sports Odisha, Radha Gobinda Club, and Radha Raman Club have won it once.

In a total competition revamp, FAO League was converted to a three tier first division highest level footballing league of the state in 2018. The First Division League currently has three tiers, Diamond, Gold and Silver leagues, followed by the Second Division.

League structure

Venues

Bhubaneswar
 Kalinga Stadium

Cuttack
 Barabati Stadium
 Odisha Police Ground
 Satyabrata Stadium

Diamond League

Clubs

East Coast Railway
Odisha Police
Radha Raman Club
Rising Students Club
Rovers Club
Sports Hostel
Sunrise Club
Young Utkal Club

Champions

Championships by team

Gold League

Clubs

Bidanasi Club
Chand Club
Jay Durga Club
Mangala Club
Radha Gobinda Club
Rising Star Club
Sunshine Club

Winners

Silver League

Clubs

Silver A

Azad Hind Club
Kishore Club
Lalbagh Club
SBI Sports Recreation Club

Silver B

Chauliaganj Club
Odisha Government Press Club
Town Club
Royal Club
Yuva Vandhu Cultural Group (YVCG)

Winners

FAO Second Division League

See also
Indian Super League
I-League
I-League 2nd Division
Indian football league system
Football in India

References

FAO League
4
2010 establishments in Orissa
Sports leagues established in 2010
Football in Odisha
Sports competitions in Odisha